This is a list of Danish football transfers for the 2010-11 winter transfer window. Only moves featuring at least one Danish Superliga club are listed.

The winter transfer window opened on 1 January 2011. The window closed at midnight on 1 February 2011.

Transfers 

  

Football transfers winter 2010–11
2010–11
2010–11 in Danish football